Albert Henry Fullwood (15 March 1863 – 1 October 1930) was an Australian artist who made a significant contribution to art in Australia. He painted with Heidelberg School artists around Melbourne and moved with Tom Roberts and Arthur Streeton to live and paint at their camp in Sirius Cove, Sydney. Fullwood was the Australian official war artist to the 5th Division in the World War I.

Biography 

Fullwood was born in Hockely, Birmingham, son of Frederick John Fullwood, jeweller, and his wife Emma, née Barr. From 1878, Fullwood studied art at evening classes at the Birmingham Institute. He studied art at the Birmingham School of Landscape Art at the Birmingham YMCA. After graduation, he migrated to Sydney in 1883 and obtained work at John Sands Limited as a lithographic draughtsman and designer. He joined the Art Society of New South Wales in 1884, and shortly afterwards obtained a position on the staff of the Picturesque Atlas of Australia, for which he traveled a good deal through Northern Australia and did many drawings. He later worked on The Sydney Mail and other illustrated papers of the time. He kept up his painting, and in 1892 two of his water-colours were purchased for the national gallery at Sydney.

In 1895 Fullwood took a leading part in forming the Society of Artists in Sydney and was a member of its first council. He returned to Europe in 1900 by way of America, holding on the way a very successful exhibition of his work in New York City. Making London his headquarters, Fullwood exhibited at the Royal Academy in 1901, 1904, and later years, and also at various exhibitions in Europe. Soon after World War I started, Fullwood joined the Allied Art Corps; later he was a sergeant in the Royal Army Medical Corps based at the 3rd London General Hospital, Wandsworth, and later an Australian official war artist. He returned to Sydney in 1920 and worked chiefly in water-colour and etching. Fullwood was a co-founder, with John Shirlow, of the Australian Painter-Etchers' Society.

Fullwood is represented in numerous galleries including the Art Gallery of New South Wales, the National Gallery of Victoria, the Art Gallery of South Australia, the Wollongong Art Gallery, Staatliche Kunstsammlungen Dresden, the Budapest Museum of Fine Arts, and in the Australian War Memorial. A significant painting of the early Ballarat streetscape is held by Ballarat Art Gallery and a very large watercolour of Chalk Quarries is held in a private collection in Doreen, Victoria.

Personal life 
He married Clyda Blanche Newman, daughter of photographer John Hubert Newman, on 13 October 1896 in Sydney. They had two sons, Philip L. Fullwood and Geoffrey Barr Fullwood, and a daughter Marjorie Clyda. Both Philip and Marjorie pre-deceased him.

Gallery

References

External links 

1863 births
1930 deaths
Australian etchers
Australian people of English descent
People from Birmingham, West Midlands
19th-century Australian painters
19th-century Australian male artists
20th-century Australian painters
20th-century Australian male artists
20th-century printmakers
Australian landscape painters
Burials at Rookwood Cemetery
Heidelberg School
Australian male painters